Alexsander is a Portuguese male given name, derived from Alexander. It may also refer to:

 Alexsander (footballer, born 1998), Alexsander Jhonatta de Oliveira Andrade, Brazilian football midfielder for Vitória
 Alexsander (footballer, born 2003), Alexsander Christian Gomes da Costa, Brazilian football midfielder for Fluminense

See also
 Alex Sander (born 1997), Indonesian football goalkeeper

Portuguese masculine given names